Missing in action is the status of a missing member of the armed services.

Missing in action may also refer to:

 Missing in Action (film), a 1984 film starring Chuck Norris
 Missing in Action 2: The Beginning, the 1985 prequel
 Braddock: Missing in Action III, the 1988 sequel
 Missing in Action (video game), a 1989 game by Konami
 "Missing in Action" (Star Wars: The Clone Wars), a fifth-season episode of Star Wars: The Clone Wars
 Missing in Action (album), an album by Dale Bozzio

See also
 POW/MIA
 Mia (disambiguation)